The 1945–46 Southern Football League was the sixth and last edition of the regional war-time football league tournament in Scotland.

With the war itself at an end, the clubs from the North Eastern League joined the setup, although only Aberdeen (who had won four of the eight half-season North Eastern tournaments) participated in the A Division; the rest of the clubs were placed in the B Division along with some from the Southern region including those who had finished at the foot of the table in its previous season.

Rangers were the last winners, thus completing a clean sweep of the seven wartime league seasons including the Emergency League in 1939–40. The Glasgow club had also won the final regular championship in 1938–39, and went on to win the next after official competitions were resumed in the 1946–47 season.

Dundee won the B Division by a large margin but were not promoted, with the SFL opting to keep the 16-team Southern League setup (this would remain in place until an expansion to 18 in 1955–56) – although it had been a 20-team division in 1938–39. Dundee also won the 1946–47 Scottish Division B title to regain a top-level place which they had held since their formation in 1893 and only relinquished for the first time in 1938.

A Division

B Division

References

season
1
Scot